Stefan Bolliger is a Swiss orienteering competitor. He participated in the 1987 World Orienteering Championships in Gérardmer, where he placed fifth in the individual course, and won a silver medal in the relay. He competed at the 1989 World Championships in Skövde, where he placed fifth in the relay with the Swiss team.

References

Year of birth missing (living people)
Living people
Swiss orienteers
Male orienteers
Foot orienteers
World Orienteering Championships medalists
20th-century Swiss people